Happyland is an American comedy drama television series created by Ben Epstein. The series aired for one eight-episode season from September 30 through November 18, 2014, on MTV.
On January 8, 2015, MTV officially cancelled the series.

Plot
Happyland follows the reality of the park workers of one of the most popular theme parks in America. The series centers on Lucy, the cynical daughter of the park's Princess Adriana, who, after deciding that she wants to leave the park and experience something real, is swept off her feet by the new park owner's son, Ian, not knowing that Ian is one of her half brothers and the park owner is her real dad.

Cast
Main cast
 Bianca A. Santos as Lucy Velez, is the secret love child of Elena Velez and James Chandler, who was raised by her single mother and not knowing who her dad is. When she first kisses Ian, her mother interrupts them and reveals that Ian is her brother, also revealing that her dad is James Chandler. When she and Ian are partnered together as Princess Adriana and Prince Valor, she freaks out when they have to kiss and tells him that they are siblings. Soon after, they discover that they are not siblings and kiss again.
 Camille Guaty as Elena Velez, is the mother of Lucy and has been working in Happyland amusement park for 20 years as Princess Adriana. When she was in her late teens, she had a fling with James and became pregnant with Lucy. After he discovered the pregnancy, he left for New York with his family, leaving Elena to be a single mother. She kept the identity of Lucy's dad a secret.
 Shane Harper as Ian Chandler, is the son of James and brother of Theodore. Ian first meets Lucy when he is high inside the Ricky Raccoon costume and faints on stage. When Ian and Lucy are doing a scene together, she reveals to him that they are brother and sister. Later they discover they are not brother and sister. He is also a Love Child.
 Ryan Rottman as Theodore "Theo" Chandler, is the son of James and older brother of Ian and Lucy. Theodore works in the Happyland executive department under his father. He is also unaware that he is related to Lucy.
 Katherine McNamara as Harper Munroe, is Lucy's friend and Will's girlfriend. She is insecure about her relationship with Will because she believes he is in love with Lucy.
Cameron Moulene as Will Armstrong, is Lucy's best friend and Harper's boyfriend. He is possibly in love with Lucy but can't admit it. When he meets Ian, he becomes jealous of his relationship with Lucy and acts out.

Recurring cast
Brady Smith as James Chandler, owner of Happyland. He is the father of Theodore, Ian, and Lucy. He is involved with Elena, although he is married to Margot Chandler.
Chris Sheffield as Noah Watson. He is a college intern at Happyland and dated Lucy for a short while before she found out that he was cheating on her.
Josh Groban as "Dirty" Dave, a Happyland bartender. He is a long-time employee and therefore knows a lot about the people that come and out of the park.
Danielle Bisutti as Margot Chandler, the wife of James and the mother of Theodore and Ian. She is unaware of James and Elena's affair, although she might have some secrets of her own.

Episodes

Reception 
On Rotten Tomatoes, the series has an aggregate review score of 56% based on 5 positive and 4 negative critic reviews.

References

External links
 

2010s American comedy-drama television series
2010s American teen drama television series
2010s American teen sitcoms
2010s American workplace comedy television series
2010s American workplace drama television series
2014 American television series debuts
2014 American television series endings
English-language television shows
MTV original programming
Incest in television
Amusement parks in fiction
Television series about teenagers